Inti Watana (Quechua, Hispanicized spelling Intihuatana) may refer to:

 Intihuatana, a ritual stone in South America associated with the Incan calendar
 Inti Watana, Ayacucho, an archaeological site in the Vilcas Huamán Province, Ayacucho Region, Peru
 Inti Watana, Calca, an archaeological site in the Pisac District, Calca Province, Cusco Region, Peru
 Inti Watana, Urubamba, an archaeological site in the Machupicchu District, Urubamba Province, Cusco Region, Peru
 Inti Watana II and III, also known as Usqunta I and II, an archaeological site in the Lucanas Province, Ayacucho Region, Peru